Marin Baumann (born 1 February 1992) is a French badminton player. In 2012, he became the runner-up of the Bulgarian Hebar Open in the men's doubles event with his partner Lucas Corvée. In 2015, he became the runner-up of the Slovenia International tournament in the mixed doubles event with Lorraine Baumann.

Achievements

BWF International Challenge/Series 
Men's doubles

Mixed doubles

  BWF International Challenge tournament
  BWF International Series tournament
  BWF Future Series tournament

References

External links 
 

1992 births
Living people
French male badminton players
21st-century French people